The UK Open Billiards Championship, formerly known as the UK Professional English Billiards Championship, is an English billiards tournament, first contested in 1934. Joe Davis won the inaugural title with a 18,745–18,309 defeat of Tom Newman.

For some years after 1934, the UK Championship was regarded as the premier event of the billiards season in the UK, in the absence of any contests for the world championships. Walter Lindrum had won the World Professional Championship in 1933, and insisted that the competition should be held in Australia for his defence. The Billiards Association and Control Council agreed to this, and Davis travelled to Australia for the 1934 Championship, where he was disappointed by the lack of planning for the tournament, and found it hard to raise the money for his return to the UK. Lindrum retained the world championship in 1934, and it was not contested again until 1952. 

Davis defeated Newman in each annual UK championship final up to 1939. The tournament was not held from 1940 to 1945, during World War II. Davis also took the first post-war title, with a walkover over John Barrie. The Championship was staged three more times before being in abeyance from 1952 to 1978. After a further hiatus from 2002 to 2014, World Billiards reinstituted the tournament as an open event in 2015. From 1987, it has sometimes been played as a "short format" event, for example in January 1988 the matches before the final were the best-of-seven games of 150-up, and the final was the best-of-thirteen games of 150-up.

David Causier won the 2019 title, with a 632–315 victory over Mark Hirst in the final. The competition was not held in 2020 due to the COVID-19 pandemic.

Finals

Notes

References

Recurring sporting events established in 1934